Xerotyphlops is a genus of snakes in the family Typhlopidae.

Distribution
The five species in this genus Xerotyphlops are found in the Palearctic.

Species
The following species are recognized as being valid.
Xerotyphlops etheridgei 
Xerotyphlops luristanicus 
Xerotyphlops socotranus  
Xerotyphlops syriacus  
Xerotyphlops vermicularis 
Xerotyphlops wilsoni 

Nota bene. A binomial authority in parentheses indicates that the species was originally described in a genus other than Xerotyphlops.

References

Further reading
Hedges SB, Marion AB, Lipp KM, Marin J, Vidal N (2014). "A taxonomic framework for typhlopid snakes from the Caribbean and other regions (Reptilia, Squamata)". Caribbean Herpetology 49: 1-61. (Xerotyphlops, new genus, p. 41).

 
Snake genera